= Gardarwa =

Village in India

Coordinates: 24°16′N 83°12′E

Gardarwa is a village in Uttar Pradesh, India.
